Chris Cannan is an Australian senior career officer of the Australian Department of Foreign Affairs and Trade (DFAT) who has been the Ambassador to Israel since June 2017, until September 2020.

Personal life
He grew up in Victor Harbor, South Australia and graduated from Victor Harbor High School (VHHS).

Cannan earned a Bachelor of Arts in Journalism from the University of South Australia, a Bachelor of Arts in Asian Studies from Flinders University and a Master of Arts in Foreign Affairs and Trade from Monash University.

Career
Cannan was head of the Environment Branch at DFAT and therefore, their lead negotiator at the Rio+20 UN Conference on Sustainable Development.

References

Ambassadors of Australia to Israel
University of South Australia alumni
Flinders University alumni
Monash University alumni
Living people
People from South Australia
Year of birth missing (living people)